The pale-winged midget (Elaphria festivoides) is a species of moth of the family Noctuidae. It is found from coast to coast in southern Canada and the northern United States.

Elaphria alapallida was split from Elaphria festivoides by Pogue and Sullivan in 2003. The species is very similar to the Festive Midget E. festivoides, and was not recognized as a distinct species until 2003. It is best distinguished by genital differences and geographic range.

The wingspan is 24–28 mm. Adults are on wing from May to July. There is one generation per year.

Larvae of E. festivoides have been reared on Acer negundo. The hostplant preferences of E. alapallida may be similar.

External links
Bug Guide
Images

Caradrinini
Moths of North America